Valentin Stanič or Stanig (12 February 1774 – 29 April 1847) was a Slovene Roman Catholic priest, mountaineer, poet, writer, translator, teacher, and cultural activist. He was born in Bodrež and died in Gorizia.

Stanič spelled his surname Stanig during his lifetime. The Slovenized spelling of his surname, Stanič, appeared by 1848, a year after his death.

The Stanič Shelter on Mount Triglav is named after the poet.

Notable life events
1790 – began school in Tarvisio
1793 – arrived in Salzburg
1798 – entered the seminary
1800 – first to climb to the highest point of The Watzmann 
1802 – finished his studies, and was ordained
1807 – founded a small printing office 
1808 – climbed Triglav and measured its height
1822 – published the first Slovenian printed book in Gorizia: Songs for farmers and young people
1840 – founded the first Slovenian bookshop in Gorizia.
1845 – joined the "Association Against the Torture of Animals" in Munich
1846 – the first in what was then Austria in Gorizia founded Society for the Prevention of Cruelty to Animals

References

Bibliography
 
 Peter Zimmermann (ed.): Valentin Stanič – Bergsteiger, Schriftsteller, Wohltäter. Eigenverlag der Bayerisch-Slowenischen Gesellschaft, Regensburg 2000. Digitalisat (PDF, 4.9 MB)

External links

1774 births
1847 deaths
Slovenian mountain climbers
19th-century Slovenian Roman Catholic priests
Slovenian writers
People from Gorizia
People from the Municipality of Kanal